Blepharidopterus chlorionis, known commonly as the honeylocust plant bug and under the synonym Diaphnocoris chlorionis, is a hemipteran in the family Miridae. They are a major pest of the honey locust tree (Gleditsia triacanthos), a deciduous tree native to central North America.

References

External links
 
 
 

Agricultural pest insects
Hemiptera of North America
Insects described in 1832
Orthotylini